= Drug and Chemical Toxicology =

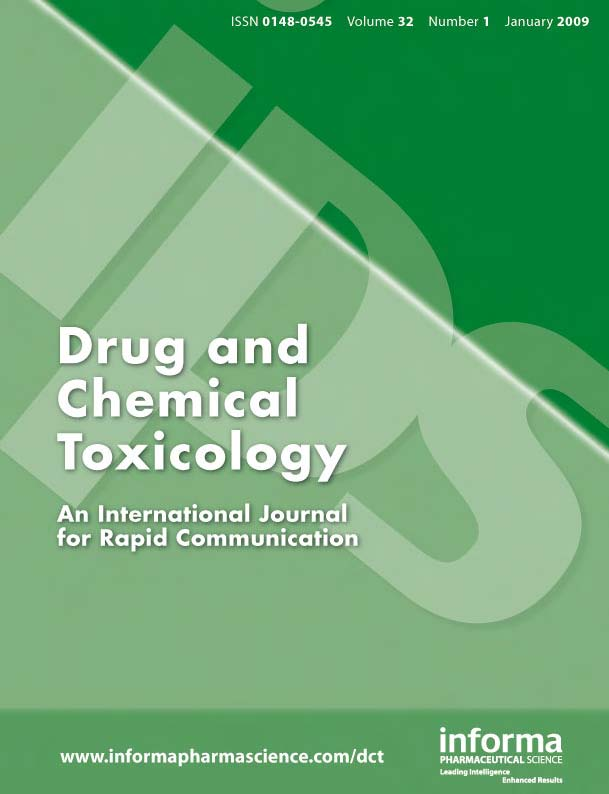
- Discipline: Toxicology
- Language: English
- Edited by: Marc A. Williams

Publication details
- History: 1978-present
- Publisher: Taylor & Francis
- Frequency: Bimonthly
- Impact factor: 3.356 (2020)

Standard abbreviations
- ISO 4: Drug Chem. Toxicol.

Indexing
- CODEN: DCTODJ
- ISSN: 0148-0545 (print); 1525-6014 (web)
- LCCN: 77645155
- OCLC no.: 03500584

Links
- Journal homepage; Online access; Online archive

Drug and Chemical Toxicology is a bimonthly peer-reviewed medical journal that publishes full-length research papers, review articles, and short communications that encompass a broad spectrum of toxicological data surrounding risk assessment and harmful exposure. It is published by Taylor & Francis and the editor in chief is Marc A. Williams.

According to the Journal Citation Reports, the journal has a 2020 impact factor of 3.356.
